The 1882 Vermont gubernatorial election took place on September 5, 1882. Incumbent Republican Roswell Farnham, per the "Mountain Rule", did not run for re-election to a second term as Governor of Vermont. Republican candidate John L. Barstow defeated Democratic candidate George W. Eaton to succeed him.

Results

References

Vermont
1882
Gubernatorial
September 1882 events